The Danish People's Party (DF or sometimes in English DPP) is a nationalist and right-wing populist political party in Denmark. It was formed in 1995 by former members of the Progress Party (FrP).

The party saw a period of significant growth after its founding and lent its support to the Venstre–Conservative People's Party coalition government that ruled from the general election of 2001 until the 2011 election defeat. While not part of the cabinet, DF cooperated closely with the governing coalition on most issues and received support for key political stances in return, to the point that the government was commonly referred to as the "VKO-government" (O being DF's election symbol). It also provided parliamentary support to Lars Løkke Rasmussen's cabinets from 2016 to 2019, again without participating in it. In the 2014 European Parliament election in Denmark, DF secured 27% of the vote as part of the European Conservatives and Reformists group. This was followed by receiving 21% of the vote in the 2015 general election, becoming the second largest party in Denmark for the first time. 

However, since 2015 the party has since seen a decline in support, falling to 3rd place and 10.8% of the vote in the 2019 European Parliament election in Denmark, and to just 8.7% in the 2019 Danish general election, resulting in a loss of 21 seats and a return to opposition. The party would later lose over half of its seats in the 2021 Danish local elections, losing 130 of the 221 it held before the election, achieving just 4.1% of the vote. Some commentators attributed the losses to internal conditions within the party and conflicts with the leadership, its perceived indecisiveness in government and rival parties adopting many of its policy ideas. The DF would also suffer a number of defections during 2022 following the rise of the Denmark Democrats party which many former DF members and supporters joined. It would receive its worst general election result ever in 2022, when it only won five seats. As of Februar 2023, due to defections from Nye Borgerlige, DF now has seven of the seats in the Danish Folketing.

History
The party's popularity has grown since its inception, taking 25 seats in the 179-member Folketing in the 2007 parliamentary election (13.8% of the vote, remaining the third largest party in Denmark). In the 2011 parliamentary election, while maintaining its position as the third largest party, DF received 12.3% of the vote, marking its first electoral decline.

Early years (1995–2001)

The Danish People's Party was founded on 6 October 1995, after Pia Kjærsgaard, Kristian Thulesen Dahl, broke out from the Progress Party. Its first national convention was held in Vissenbjerg on 1 June 1996, where Pia Kjærsgaard was unanimously elected as the party's chairman. The party was established in protest over the "anarchistic conditions" of the Progress Party, and its "all or nothing" policies. It was initially seen by many as a "clone" of the Progress Party, but this was soon proved false. In a struggle to be respected as a responsible party able to cooperate with others and distance it from the conditions in the Progress Party, the leadership of the party struck down criticism from its members by means of expulsions. The party saw a highly centralized party leadership as necessary, as it would not tolerate internal conflicts and disagreements with the official strategy.

The party was the first successful parliamentary party in the Nordic countries to relate philosophically more closely to the French Nouvelle Droite, than to the previous Nordic form of right-wing populism. DF represented a synthesis of several political currents: the Lutheran movement Tidehverv and its related journal, an intellectual nationalist right from the Danish Association (Den Danske Forening) and conservative populists from the Progress Party.

In 1997, the party won about 7% in the municipal elections, and did very well in traditional left-wing municipalities, potentially rivaling the Social Democrats. By 1998, the party had 2,500 registered members. The party made its electoral debut in the 1998 Danish parliamentary election, winning 13 seats and 7.4% of the vote. The party was, however, left with no influence in the formation of a government; it was shut out in large part due to the perception that it was not stuerent (i.e. not acceptable or "housebroken").

Conservative-Liberal coalition (2001–2011)
In the 2001 election, the party won 12% of the vote and 22 seats in parliament. It became the third largest party in the parliament, giving them a key position, as they would have a parliamentary majority together with the Conservative People's Party and Venstre. DF was favoured by these parties, as it had supported the Venstre candidate for Prime Minister, Anders Fogh Rasmussen, during the election campaign. Eventually, it gave its parliamentary support for a Conservative-Liberal coalition government, headed by Prime Minister Rasmussen, in exchange for the implementation of some of their key demands, first and foremost stricter policies on immigration. The party had a key role in writing the rules and conditions for immigration in the immigration law that was established by the government in May 2002, which it called "Europe's strictest".

In the 2005 election the party further increased their vote, and won 13.2% of the vote and 24 seats. With young first-time voters the party was even more popular, receiving one fifth of their votes. The party continued to support the government, and developed a broader policy base, as it made welfare policies its core issue, together with immigration policies.

In 2006, the party's popularity rose dramatically in opinion polls following the Jyllands-Posten Muhammad cartoons controversy, at the expense of the Social Democrats. The average of all monthly national polls showed DF gaining seven seats in parliament from January to February, with the Social Democrats losing an equal amount. This effect, however, somewhat waned with the falling media attention to the cartoons controversy.

In the 2007 parliamentary election, DF won 13.9% and 25 seats, and again continued to support the Conservative-Liberal government. Thus, in every election since its founding the party has had a steady growth, although the growth rate has stagnated somewhat in recent years. Parties in the political centre, particularly the newly founded New Alliance had sought to become the kingmaker and be able to isolate the immigration policies of DF, but eventually failed. The party was a member of the Movement for a Europe of Liberties and Democracy (MELD).

In the 2009 elections for the European Parliament the prime candidate for the party, Morten Messerschmidt, won his seat in a landslide with 284,500 personal votes (most votes for any single candidate by any party); thus giving the party a second seat (which went to Anna Rosbach Andersen). The party made a breakthrough from its previous results in European elections, more than doubling its vote to 15.3%, and receiving 2 MEPs.

2015 election and back in coalition
During the 2015 election the DF won 21.08% of the national vote under the leadership of Kristian Thulesen Dahl, the highest since its founding and gained 37 seats putting the party in second place. In the aftermath, the party entered negotiations with Venstre to again provide parliamentary support in return for stricter policies on immigration and the EU. A minority government headed by Lars Løkke Rasmussen was subsequently formed with the DF, the Liberal Alliance and the Conservative People's Party providing support.

2019–present: Opposition to Frederiksen I and II 
The party suffered a major defeat in the 2019 election, recording its worst result since 1998. It won just 8.7% of the vote and 16 seats, a net loss of 21 seats since 2015; it fell to third place, just narrowly outpolling the Social Liberals. Some journalists and political commentators opined that the DF's loss in support was as a result of the party's refusal and indecisiveness on taking direct part in government and the main parties including the Social Democrats adopting many of the DF's policies on immigration and integration.

In January 2022, Dahl stood down as leader and was replaced by Morten Messerschmidt in a leadership election where he won 499 out of the 828 delegators' votes againt two other candidates. After Messerschmidt a total of 11 out of 16 MPs had in June left the party including Thuelsen Dahl who as the only one of thoese passed on his seat to the next in line.

At the 2022 election, the party suffered its worst election result ever with 2.6 % of the vote equal to 5 seats. In December 2022, Morten Messerschmidt was acquitted of all charges accordring to several political analysts and commentators paving the way for a restoration of the party. In january 2023, MP for the Nye Borgerlige political party Mikkel Bjørn Sørensen left his party and joined the DF increseing its seat count to 6 with Messerschmidt stating "Mikkel Bjørn is an excellent and conservative nationally rooted politician who has God, king and fatherland tattooed right into his heart". On 6 February 2023 former Nye Borgerlige MP Mette Thiesen also joined the DF.

Policies
DF is a nationalist and right-wing populist party. It is positioned on the right-wing of the political spectrum. The DF's stated goals are to protect the freedom and cultural heritage of the Danish people, including the family, the Monarchy and the Evangelical Lutheran Church of Denmark, to enforce a strict rule of law, to work against Denmark becoming a multi-cultural society by limiting immigration and promoting cultural assimilation of admitted immigrants, to maintain a strong welfare system for those in need, and to promote entrepreneurship and economic growth by strengthening education and encouraging people to work, to protect the environment and natural resources, and to protect Danish sovereignty against the European Union. In comparison to its predecessor, the Progress Party, the DF focuses more on immigration, while at the same time being more pragmatic on other topics. While overall considered part of the radical right, its policies on most economic issues would rather place the party in the centre to centre-left. The party's former leader, Kristian Thulesen Dahl, once declared DF an anti-Muslim party.

Immigration
DF is opposed to immigration. The party holds that Denmark is not naturally a country of immigration. The party also does not accept a multi-ethnic transformation of Denmark, and rejects multiculturalism. Former party leader Pia Kjærsgaard stated she did "not want Denmark as a multiethnic, multicultural society", and that a multiethnic Denmark would be a "national disaster". The party seeks to drastically reduce non-Western immigration, opposes and favors cultural assimilation of immigrants from all religions. In 2010, the party proposed to put a complete stop to all immigration from non-Western countries, a continuation of a proposal the month before to toughen the 24-year rule. They do, however, make the distinction between immigrants, those who intend to stay in Denmark permanently, and refugees, those that will only be in Denmark for the duration of the conflict, but ultimately intend to return home. The party has stated that it is more than happy to help those in need, but have a moral responsibility to the people of Denmark to keep Denmark Danish.

Cooperation with the Conservative-Liberal coalition government resulted in the implementation of some of their key demands, most importantly strong restrictions in immigration policies, which have resulted in what is often described as Europe's strictest immigration laws. The new government enacted rules that prevented Danish citizens and others from bringing a foreign spouse into the country unless both partners were aged 24 or above, passed a solvency test showing the Dane had not claimed social security for 12 months, and could lodge a bond of 60,011 kroner (about US$10,100). One declared aim of this was to fight arranged marriages. These new rules had the effect that while about 8,151 family reunification permits were granted in 2002, the number had fallen to 3,525 by 2005. Some social benefits for refugees were also cut by 30-40% during their first seven years in power. Ordinary unemployment benefits were replaced by a reduced "start-up aid". Whereas the government coalition's declared aim with this was to improve integration by inciting people to work, immigration spokesman Søren Krarup of DF has expressed his content in that the start-up aid has decreased the number of economic refugees greatly, showing them that "one does not find gold on the street, as has been told out in the third world". Nevertheless, total immigration increased post implementation of the migration reforms.

Other domestic
The party wants to improve conditions for the elderly and disabled, and advocates stricter punishments for crimes such as rape, violence, sexual abuse, reckless driving, and cruelty to animals. It supports grants for specific research into terrorism, Islamism, and Cold War history as well as increased defense spending. It also wants to maintain the Danish monarchy and the current Danish constitution, and to abolish the 'hate speech' clause in the Danish criminal code.

Foreign

The party opposes a cession of Denmark's sovereignty to the European Union and opposes further EU integration and Eurofederalism. It also opposes the Euro currency and wants to maintain the Danish krone. It is also against the potential accession of Turkey to the European Union. DF is Eurosceptic.

The party initially voted in favour of the 2003 invasion of Iraq, but in 2014, the foreign affairs spokesman Søren Espersen said this support had been mistaken and that the rule of former dictator Saddam Hussein was "far preferable" to the events that followed. He claimed the party had "blindly followed" Prime Minister Anders Fogh Rasmussen at the time of the invasion.

The party supported Danish enforcement of a no-fly zone during the 2011 military intervention in Libya, but was initially sceptical of proposals for direct Danish military involvement. The party later supported the decision out of solidarity with NATO. The party leadership subsequently supported extending the Danish mission in Libya, despite the disagreement of its defense spokesman Ib Poulsen. Three years after the intervention, foreign affairs spokesman Espersen stated the party's support for the intervention was a "mistake" and predicated on a misunderstanding of the ideology of the Libyan rebels.

The party supported Danish participation in France's Operation Serval against Islamist fighters in Mali. However, it opposed proposals for Danish involvement in the Syrian Civil War.
 
The party seeks international recognition of Taiwan and supports Taiwan in its disputes with the People's Republic of China. In 2007, the party opposed the Danish government's plan to recognise the independence of Kosovo, and maintained the territorial integrity of Serbia. The DF is supportive of Israel and opposes the recognition of Palestine on the grounds that there is no effective Palestinian state, and wants to move the Danish embassy in Israel to Jerusalem. The DF also supports Danish membership of NATO.

Analysis of vote

 An analysis by the trade union SiD after the 2001 election stated that among unskilled workers aged under 40, 30% voted for DF and only 25% for the Social Democrats.
 Decreased importance of "economic cleavage": Several authors believe that the political "cleavages" of European societies have changed over recent decades Contemporary Western European democracies are characterized by two major cleavage dimensions: the economic cleavage dimension, which pits workers against the capital, and which concerns the degree of state involvement in the economy, and the socio-cultural cleavage dimension.
 Referendums brought the rejection of the Maastricht Treaty and the Euro. The DF has managed to harness this scepticism more effectively than others.

One feature, compared to other Danish parties, is that the Danish People's Party is usually underrepresented by about 1-1.5% in opinion polls. Election researchers have suggested that the party's voters may be less interested in politics, and therefore declining to talk to pollsters, or that voters are reluctant to reveal their support for the party to pollsters.

Leaders 
The party has had the following leaders since its foundation:

Election results

Parliament

Local elections

European Parliament

See also

 Politics of Denmark

References

Sources

External links
 
 
  Dansk Folkeparti - Official site
 The Party Program of the Danish People's Party Official website (page in English).

European Conservatives and Reformists member parties
Political parties established in 1995
1995 establishments in Denmark
Anti-Islam political parties in Europe
Nationalist parties in Denmark
Eurosceptic parties in Denmark
Far-right politics in Denmark
Anti-Islam sentiment in Denmark
Right-wing populism in Denmark
Right-wing populist parties
Anti-immigration politics in Europe
Social conservative parties
National conservative parties
Conservative parties in Denmark
Right-wing parties in Europe